Metropolitan Iakovos of Chicago (Michael Garmatis; April 4, 1928 – June 2, 2017) was Metropolitan of Chicago under the Ecumenical Patriarchate of Constantinople until his death on June 2, 2017.

Biography
Garmatis began his higher education in Athens, Greece, and continued his studies and service in the Boston area. He was appointed Archdiocesan Vicar of the Diocese of Detroit by Archbishop Iakovos in February 1968. One year later, he was elevated to the rank of Bishop by the Holy See of Constantinople. He was consecrated Bishop of Apameia (an Auxiliary Bishop of Archbishop Iakovos) on Christmas Day of 1969, and appointed to the Diocese of Detroit as Bishop of that district.

In 1971 Garmatis was appointed President of Hellenic College and Holy Cross School of Theology in Brookline, Massachusetts, while remaining as administrative overseer of the Diocese of Detroit. He simultaneously served as the Bishop of the New England area during his five-year tenure as President of Hellenic College and Holy Cross School of Theology.

Garmatis was elected to the episcopacy of the Greek Orthodox Church by the Holy and Sacred Synod of the Ecumenical Patriarchate of Constantinople in 1969. He was enthroned by Archbishop Iakovos of the Greek Orthodox Archdiocese of North and South America on May 1, 1979, as the Bishop of Chicago at the Annunciation Cathedral. In November 1997, the Holy Synod of the Ecumenical Patriarchate elected Garmatis to the active Metropolitanate of Chicago and Exarch of Ionia. In this capacity, he served the Greek Orthodox Metropolis of Chicago as its Presiding Hierarch (proedros).

The Diocese of Chicago consists of 34 parishes in Illinois, with another 24 parishes in Wisconsin, Minnesota, Iowa, northern Indiana, and eastern Missouri. The general offices of the Greek Orthodox Metropolis of Chicago are located in Chicago, Illinois.

Under Garmatis' leadership the diocese has increased its efforts to assist the homeless and those in need, as witnessed in the labors of the Diocesan Philanthropy Committee. He has founded new youth programs and established various local dialogue commissions with other faith communities.

Garmatis also established the Bishop Iakovos Scholarship Assistance Program, the Bishop's Task Force on AIDS, the Diocese Junior Olympics, the Diocese Dance Festival, as well as numerous programs in religion and Greek education.

Garmatis died on June 2, 2017 at the Louis A. Weiss Memorial Hospital in Chicago following surgical complications at the age of 89.

References

Sources
Metropolitan Iakovos of Chicago  from the Greek Orthodox Metropolis of Chicago
Metropolitan Iakovos of Chicago Falls Asleep in the Lord from the Greek Orthodox Archdiocese of America

External links
Listing on the Orthodox Research Institute

1928 births
2017 deaths
Eastern Orthodox metropolitans
Christianity in Chicago
People from Chicago
Greek Orthodox Christians from the United States
Bishops in Illinois